Barbara Kolanka or Barbara Kołówna h. Junosza (end of the 15th century–1550) was a Polish noblewoman. She is best known as the mother of queen Barbara Radziwiłł and Mikołaj "the Red" Radziwiłł.

Biography 
A direct descendant to Elisabeth of Pilcza, the Queen consort to Ladislaus II of Poland, she was born in late 15th century to Paweł Koła (or Kola) of Dalejów and Żółtanice, a prominent Polish politician. Her father was a Chamberlain (since 1490) and castellan of Halicz who in 1502 rose to the rank of Voivod of Podolia. Her mother was Bruneta of Chodcza. She had three older brothers, one of whom (Jan Koła) rose to the rank of Grand Hetman of The Crown.

Marriage and issue

In ca. 1515 she married Jerzy "Herkules" Radziwiłł. They had three children:

 Mikołaj "the Red" Radziwiłł (1512–1584), who would later become Grand Hetman of Lithuania, married to Katarzyna Tomnicka-Lwińska h. Łodzia
 Anna Elżbieta Radziwiłł (1518–1558), married Symeon Holszański Dubrowicki h. Hipocentaur and marszałek of Volhynia Piotr Kiszka h. Dąbrowa (died 1550) in 1548
 Barbara Radziwiłł (1520–1551), who in 1547 secretly married king of Poland Sigismund II Augustus and was crowned the queen consort the following year, despite protests by the Sejm and the Senate.

References

Year of birth unknown
1550 deaths
Barbara